The Lieyi Zhuan (lit. "Arrayed Marvels"), from the late 2nd or early 3rd century is a collection of Zhiguai, a Chinese literary genre that deals with strange (mostly supernatural) events and stories. It is attributed to Cao Pi (187-226 CE).

References

Chinese literature